Dominique Heinrich (born July 31, 1990) is an Austrian professional ice hockey defenseman currently playing for EC Red Bull Salzburg in the ICE Hockey League (ICEHL).

Playing career 
After 9 seasons within Salzburg's organization, Heinrich left as a free agent in order to pursue an SHL career in Sweden, agreeing to a two-year contract with Örebro HK on April 27, 2016. However, in January 2017, he returned to Salzburg.

He participated at the 2015 IIHF World Championship with the Austrian national team.

References

External links

1990 births
Living people
Austrian ice hockey defencemen
EC Red Bull Salzburg players
Ice hockey people from Vienna
Örebro HK players